Van Boetzelaer (or: van den Boetzelaer) is an old aristocratic family that stems from the region of Kalkar, Germany.

History
The family history in the Duchy of Cleves can be traced back to the 13th century  ("Uradel"), when the van Boetzelaers belonged to the local nobility. A castle Boetzelaer in Kalkar was rebuilt from its ruins after WWII. In the sixteenth century, the family settled in The Netherlands. Nowadays, the family belongs to the Dutch nobility. Members carry the title of baron.

Coat of arms
Based on the similarity of their coat of arms, it is likely that the van Boetzelaer family are related to the Wesphalian von Galen family. The Boetzelaer coat of arms is depicted in the medieval Gelre Armorial (folio 93r).

Famous scions
 Pim van Boetzelaer van Oosterhout (1892–1986), Dutch Minister of Foreign Affairs.

Gallery

Literature
 Polak-de Booy, E.P., Inventaris archieven van Boetzelaer, Utrecht, 1965
 des Tombe J.W., bewerkt door C.W.L. baron van Boetzelaer, Het geslacht van den Boetzelaer. De historische ontwikkeling van de rechtspositie en de staatkundige invloed van een belangrijk riddermatig geslacht, Assen, 1969
 Kruimel, H.L., Inventaris van de genealogische bescheiden nagelaten door C.W.L. Baron van Boetzelaer, 's-Gravenhage, 1978
 Polak-de Booy, E.P., Inventaris van de archieven van de familie van Boetzelaer 1316–1952, Inventarisreeks van het Rijksarchief Utrecht, 32, Rijksarchief Utrecht, Utrecht, 1982

References

External links
 Archives of the family
 Castle Boetzelaer

Boetzelaer, van
Barons of the Netherlands
Münster (region)
Dutch-language surnames
Surnames of Dutch origin